Hrabě, Hrabětová is a Czech surname. Notable people with the surname include:

 Antonín Hrabě (1902–?), Czech weightlifter
 František Hrabě, Czechoslovak slalom canoeist
 Václav Hrabě (1940–1965), Czech poet and writer

Czech-language surnames